The AK model of economic growth is an endogenous growth model used in the theory of economic growth, a subfield of modern macroeconomics. In the 1980s it became progressively clearer that the standard neoclassical exogenous growth models were theoretically unsatisfactory as tools to explore long run growth, as these models predicted economies without technological change and thus they would eventually converge to a steady state, with zero per capita growth. A fundamental reason for this is the diminishing return of capital; the key property of AK endogenous-growth model is the absence of diminishing returns to capital.  In lieu of the diminishing returns of capital implied by the usual parameterizations of a Cobb–Douglas production function, the AK model uses a linear model where output is a linear function of capital.  Its appearance in most textbooks is to introduce endogenous growth theory.

Origin of the concept

In neoclassical growth models the economy is assumed to reach a steady state in which all macroeconomic variables grow at the same rate and in the absence of technological progress, per capita growth of these macroeconomic  variables will eventually cease.  These kind of neoclassical prepositions resemble the philosophical theories found in Ricardo and Malthus. The basic underlying assumption of neoclassical philosophy is that there are diminishing returns to capital in the production process.

During the mid-1980s a new growth theory was launched by Paul Romer in 1986, where he tried to explain the growth process in a different manner. Thus the dissatisfaction with neoclassical models motivated the construction of new growth theories where the key determinations are endogenous in the model; long run growth is not determined by exogenous factors but by endogenous factors in such models.

The simplest version of an endogenous model is the AK model which assumes constant exogenous saving rate and fixed level of technology.  The stickiest assumption of this model is that the production function does not include diminishing returns to capital. This assumption means the model can lead to endogenous growth.

Graphical representation of the model

The AK model production function is a special case of a Cobb–Douglas function with constant returns to scale.
 

This equation shows a Cobb–Douglas function where Y represents the total production in an economy. A represents total factor productivity, K is capital, L is labor, and the parameter  measures the output elasticity of capital.

 = population growth rate
 = depreciation 
 = capital per worker 
 = output/income per worker
 = labor force 
 = saving rate

In an alternative form ,  embodies both physical capital and human capital.

 

In the above equation A is the level of technology which is positive constant and K represents volume of capital.
Hence, output per capita is:
   i.e.   

The model implicitly assumes that the average product of capital is equal to marginal product of capital which is equivalent to:

The model again assumes that labor force is growing at a constant rate ‘n’ and there is no depreciation of capital.  (δ = 0 )
In this case, the basic differential equation of neo-classical growth model would be:

Hence, 

But in the model   

Thus,

The united approach to  the model

To avoid the contradictions,    Russian economist  Vladimir Pokrovskii  proposed to  write the production function in the united form

This form of the  theory explains  growth as a consequence of the dynamics of the production  factors,   without  any arbitrary parameters,  which makes it possible to  reproduce historical rates of economic growth with considerable precision.

See also
 Economic growth
 Human capital
 Harrod–Domar model

References

Further reading

Economic growth
Economics models